Bruce Gilley (born July 21, 1966) is a Canadian–American professor of political science and director of the PhD program in Public Affairs and Policy at the Mark O. Hatfield School of Government at Portland State University. He is the founder and President of the Oregon Association of Scholars, member of the Heterodox Academy and founding signatory of the Oregon Academic Faculty Pledge on Freedom. Gilley gained international acclaim but also a storm of criticism for his highly controversial peer-reviewed article The Case for Colonialism, published in an advance online edition of the scientific journal Third World Quarterly in 2017. Fifteen members of the journal's board resigned over Gilley's article.

Scholarship 

Prof. Dr. Bruce Gilley a Canadian born American of Scottish decent received his Bachelor of Arts in economics and international relations from the University of Toronto in 1988. As a Commonwealth Scholar he did his Master of Economics at the University of Oxford from 1989 to 1991, and went to China to spend a year teaching English. From 1992 to 2002, he worked as a journalist in Hong Kong writing for the Eastern Express newspaper and then the Far Eastern Economic Review magazine where his biggest scoop was exposing an illicit technology transfer by a Stanford professor to China's military. Gilley was a Woodrow Wilson Scholar at Princeton University from 2004 to 2006 from where he received his PhD in politics in 2007. He became an associate professor in 2008 at the Department of Political Science of the Mark O. Hatfield School of Government at Portland State University. He was granted academic tenure in 2011 and promoted to full professor in 2016. Gilley's research centers on comparative and international politics and public policy. His work covers issues as diverse as democracy, climate change, political legitimacy, and international conflict. He is a specialist on the politics of China and Asia. His 2006 article "The meaning and measure of state legitimacy: results for 72 countries" introduced a novel multidimensional, quantitative measure of the qualitative concept of political legitimacy. His work has since been extended by other scholars, and customized to specific geographical regions such as Latin America and Europe. Gilley himself has since updated his work on quantification of legitimacy with additional empirical data.

The Case for Colonialism 
Gilley's article "The case for colonialism" was published in an advance online version of the Third World Quarterly in 2017, against the recommendation of its reviewers. According to Gilley, colonialism was both objectively beneficial (the benefits outweighed the harms) and subjectively legitimate (it was accepted by large portions of the local population). Consequently, the author calls for a revival of colonialism. The article was controversial both for its argument and for its subsequent withdrawal, and resulted in a debate about academic standards and peer review. Fifteen members of the journal's board resigned over the issue. Critics described the article as low-quality and said that it was published, over the objections of reviewers, as a form of academic clickbait. The article was ultimately retracted with Gilley's assent and re-published in the conservative National Association of Scholars' journal Academic Questions in April 2018. When asked if it would be ethical to publish a paper making a case for genocide, Gilley said, "I think everyone would agree, [genocide] is a moral wrong" but that he did not believe colonialism was a moral wrong. Geographer Reuben Rose-Redwood argued that there is a documented connection between colonialism and genocide. In the spring of 2022, Gilley responded to many of his critics in a second article entitled 'The Case for Colonialism: A Response to My Critics'.

The Last Imperialist 
Gilley's biography of Sir Alan Burns, entitled The Last Imperialist: Sir Alan Burns's Epic Defense of the British Empire, was withdrawn from publishing by Rowman & Littlefield after J. Moufawad-Paul started a petition, which gained over 1000 signatories, saying the author espoused a "pro-colonial" and "white nationalist" perspective. Gilley defended the book by saying it had passed a peer-review procedure and was endorsed by historians Tirthankar Roy and Jeremy Black; Roy confirmed that it had been peer-reviewed and that he had endorsed it and stated that "[t]hat it could be an apology for empires ... never crossed my mind, I do not think this book is one". The book was published by conservative publishing house Regnery Gateway in September 2021.

Hong Kong independence 
Gilley's views about colonialism were strongly influenced by his years as a journalist when he worked in Hong Kong. During his stay the British transferred their crown colony Hong Kong to China on the first of July 1997. The tremendous fear among the population of Hong Kong prior to the transfer of power to China in 1997 made a big impression on him.

Political Views 
Gilley describes himself as a ‘’classical liberal’’ and ‘’an independent voter’’. In 2017, Gilley withdrew from the American Political Science Association, stating that he considered it to lack intellectual diversity and to possess an anti-conservative bias. As a member of the Heterodox Academy, he has been critical of tenure evaluations which require a pledge to uphold collegiate diversity. Gilley has been critical of educational initiatives designed to enhance diversity, equity, and inclusion.

Memberships and awards 
Gilley is a member of the editorial boards of the Journal of Democracy and the Journal of Contemporary China. furthermore Gilley is the chapter president of the Oregon Association of Scholars, the state chapter of the National Association of Scholars, member of the Heterodox Academy and founding signatory of the Oregon Academic Faculty Pledge on Freedom. He is the recipient of the following awards and nominations for scholarly achievement and articles:

Commonwealth Scholarship, University of Oxford (1989–1991)
East Asian Studies Prize, Princeton University (2002)
Woodrow Wilson Scholars Fellowship, Princeton University (2004–2006)
 Marcel Cadieux Award, Best Article on Foreign Policy, Canadian Institute of International Affairs
 Nominated for Gabriel A. Almond Best Dissertation Award, American Political Science Association (2006, 2012)
 Best Dissertation in Comparative Politics, Department of Politics, Princeton University (2007)
 Frank Cass Prize, Best Article in Democratization (2010)
Dean's Award for Scholarly Achievement – Senior Faculty, College of Urban and Public Affairs (2016)

Selected publications

Authored 
 Tiger on the Brink: Jiang Zemin and China's New Elite. University of California Press, 1998. 
 Model Rebels: The Rise and Fall of China's Richest Village. University of California Press, 2001. 
 China's New Rulers: The Secret Files. New York Review of Books, New York, 2003. (With Andrew Nathan) 
 China's Democratic Future: How It Will Happen and Where It Will Lead. Columbia University Press, 2004. <ref>Reviews of China's Democratic Future:
Peg Christoff (March 2004), Library Journal 129 (4)
Stephen Green (October 2004), International Affairs 80 (5): 1022–1023, 
Scott Kennedy (Winter 2004–2005), World Policy Journal 21 (4): 77–85, 
Barrett L. McCormick (January 2005), The China Journal 53: 192–194, 
Patricia M. Thornton (Summer 2005), Political Science Quarterly 120 (2): 338–339, 
Andrew Mertha (September 2006), Perspectives on Politics 4 (3): 613–614, 
Alan P. L. Liu (2008), China Review International 15 (1): 94–96, 
Jagannath P. Panda (2008), Strategic Analysis 33 (1): 127–132, 
</ref>
 The Right to Rule: How States Win and Lose Legitimacy. Columbia University Press, 2009. 
 The Nature of Asian Politics. Cambridge University Press, 2014. 
 The Last Imperialist: Sir Alan Burns's Epic Defense of the British Empire. Regnery Gateway, 2021. 
 In Defense of German Colonialism: And How Its Critics Empowered Nazis, Communists, and the Enemies of the West. Regnery Gateway, 2022. 

 Edited 
 Middle Powers and the Rise of China. Georgetown University Press, Washington DC, 2014. (With Andrew O'Neil)
 Political Change in China: Comparisons With Taiwan. Lynne Rienner, Boulder, 2008. (With Larry Diamond)
 Asia's Giants: Comparing China and India. Palgrave Macmillan, New York, 2005. (With Edward Friedman)

Articles
 "Against the concept of ethnic conflict", Third World Quarterly. 25 (6): 1155–1166. doi:10.1080/0143659042000256959. Archived from the original on January 20, 2018.
 "The Case for Colonialism", Third World Quarterly, 2017. (Republished in Academic Questions, June 2018, Vol. 31, No. 2, pp. 167–185. )
 The Case For Colonialism In The Middle East,  A Hoover Institution essay from the caravan notebook, August 2020.
 "The Case for Colonialism: A Response to My Critics", Academic Questions'', Spring 2022.

See also
 Nigel Biggar
 Colonialism

References

Notes

Citations

External links 

 Bruce Gilley and Douglas Murray discuss one of the biggest criticisms of the West – colonialism, Uncancelled History, 2022.
 
 Video of lecture "The Case for Colonialism" at Texas Tech University, 2018. (text)
 
 List of research papers at ResearchGate
 List of his books at Goodreads

Living people
1966 births
Portland State University faculty
American political scientists
Princeton University alumni
American male journalists
American non-fiction writers
Alumni of the University of Oxford
University of Toronto alumni
Historians of China
Historians of colonialism
American people of Scottish descent
Canadian American